Okie is the fifteenth studio album by American country music singer Vince Gill. The album was released on August 23, 2019, by MCA Nashville.

Background
According to Gill, Merle Haggard advised him to "just tell the truth. That's the most important thing of all."  A number of the songs in the album have personal elements; for example in "Forever Changed" which is about sexual abuse, Gill drew from the experience of running away from a gym teacher who had behaved inappropriately toward him, while "When My Amy Prays" about is about his wife Amy Grant and religion. Other songs deal with issues such as teenage pregnancy ("What Choice Will You Make,") and racial equality.

Gill said: "My life has never been political, I've never been out there saying endorse this candidate, or that one. But I’m not afraid to have a decent conversation about some of this stuff. We could solve so many things by being fair-minded."

Gill also said: "All I tried to do was have these songs maybe be about subjects that were tough, but maybe tell these stories without judgment".

Commercial performance

Okie debuted at No. 9 on Billboard Top Country Albums with 10,000 units, 9,000 of which are traditional album sales.  This is Gill's 16th top 10 album on the chart. The album has sold 32,500 copies in the United States as of March 2020.

Track listing

Personnel
Adapted from AllMusic.

Tom Bukovac - guitar
Fred Eltringham - drums, percussion
Paul Franklin - steel guitar
Vince Gill - dobro, guitar, lead vocals, background vocals
Jedd Hughes - guitar
John Barlow Jarvis - keyboards, organ, piano
Michael Rhodes - acoustic bass guitar, bass guitar
Charlie Worsham - banjo

Charts

References

2019 albums
Vince Gill albums
MCA Records albums